Carex michelii is a species of sedge (family Cyperaceae), native to central, southern and eastern Europe, Turkey, the Caucasus, and Iran. It is typically found in semiarid grasslands.

References

michelii
Flora of France
Flora of Central Europe
Flora of Southeastern Europe
Flora of Ukraine
Flora of the Crimean Peninsula
Flora of Central European Russia
Flora of South European Russia
Flora of the Caucasus
Flora of Turkey
Flora of Iran
Plants described in 1797